Vice presidential elections  were held in Guatemala on September 16, 2015. In April 2015, international prosecutors, with help from the UN, presented evidence of a customs corruption ring ("La Línea") in which discounted tariffs were exchanged for bribes from importers; prosecutors learned of the ring through wiretaps and financial statements. Vice President Roxana Baldetti resigned on 8 May, and was arrested for her involvement on 21 August. On 21 August, Guatemalan prosecutors presented evidence of Pérez's involvement in the corruption ring. Congress, in a 132–0 vote, stripped Pérez Molina of prosecutorial immunity on 1 September 2015, and, on 2 September, he presented his resignation from the Presidency.

On 3 September, after a court hearing in which charges and evidence against him were presented, he was arrested and sent to the Matamoros prison in Guatemala City.  Vice President Alejandro Maldonado Aguirre was appointed to serve the remainder of Pérez's 4-year term in office (due to end on 14 January 2016).

Alfonso Fuentes Soria was elected Acting Vice President of Guatemala,  following the Congress of Guatemala's.

Results

References 

2015 elections in Central America
Elections in Guatemala
2015 in Guatemala
Vice presidential elections